The Chehalis, Washington park system is administered by the Chehalis Parks and Recreation Department. Trails that connect Chehalis with locations beyond the city limits are maintained in conjunction with other local jurisdictions, state government agencies, and/or local non-profit groups and volunteers.

The city contains eleven parks, many of which were created on land donated by local citizens. Millett Field, begun in 1898, is the oldest park still in use. The newest addition to the city's park and recreation program, Stan Hedwall Park, was acquired in 2014. A large donation in 2004 to restore Alexander Park has led to more than half of the parks being renovated or rebuilt, almost exclusively by volunteer efforts. Funding for this undertaking was secured thru government grants, charitable acts of local businesses, and citizen fundraising.

Parks

Chehalis has a long tradition of citizen fundraising to purchase, build, and maintain its parks. In the 21st century, a collaboration of Chehalis residents, the city government, various service clubs, and local organizations such as the Chehalis Foundation, the Lewis County Community Trails Association, and Experience Chehalis (previously the Chehalis Community Renaissance Team), have spearheaded endeavors to restore and renovate several of the parks.

Trails

Outside of the Dobson-McFadden Trail, the trails at Stan Hedwall, and footpaths located within the Recreation Park complex, the city has three significant trails, two of which extend beyond the municipality. A non-profit group, the Lewis County Community Trails Association, was organized in 2006 to help coordinate the creation of trails within the city and Lewis County. There were plans to create a trail connecting the Port of Chehalis to Stan Hedwall Park and nearby tourist locations in the 2000s, but despite a small feasibility study, the project did not proceed. Future plans include linking recreational areas in Chehalis to parks and trails in Centralia, ultimately connecting the entire system with the Willapa Hills Trail.

Airport Levee Trail

The trail is mixed paved-gravel built atop a levee and loops for  around the Chehalis-Centralia Airport and Twin City Town Center. Built in large part by community efforts and $300,000 in funding from TransAlta, the trail was first available for use in 2010. The trail provides views of the Riverside Golf Course, airport, and farmland, with views of the Chehalis River.

Airport Road Trail
Completed in 2014, the south trailhead links with the Airport Levee Trail and continues north, passing over Salzer Creek and into Centralia, officially terminating at the Twin Transit Mellen Street station. Future plans include building ramps to an existing pedestrian portion of the I-5 bridge over the Skookumchuck River which would link the trail to Fort Borst Park and other recreational areas in Centralia.

Willapa Hills Trail

At , the intercounty trail is part of the Willapa Hills State Park and stretches from Chehalis to South Bend, Washington. It is built over a decommissioned railroad. The trail journeys near or thru such Lewis County towns as Adna, Claquato, Ceres, Doty, and McCormick, while passing by the ghost town of Walville. A spur allows users to traverse thru Rainbow Falls State Park near Dryad. Mostly complete within Lewis County, with a mix of pavement and compact gravel, the trail is considered unimproved for large stretches in Pacific County. The trail is under the maintenance auspices of the Washington State Park System and is open for non-motorized activities year round to hikers, bicyclists, and horse riding.

Defunct parks

Chehalis Municipal Rose Garden

The Chehalis Municipal Rose Garden was a test garden for the commercial viability of certain rose species and was located near the present day site of the Vernetta Smith Chehalis Timberland Library. The area was created in 1934 and held annual gardening events and competitions, but the garden was removed during the demolition of the previous library in 2007. The rose bushes were transplanted to Henderson Park but did not thrive.

Duffy Park

In 1902, the  park was bestowed to Chehalis by Horatio J. (H.J.) Duffy for $1. Once named "Scenery Park", the area was never officially listed as a park by the city and only referred to as an "unimproved park".

Duffy Park is located on the hillside, south-southeast of McFadden Park, and there are no signs or trail markers. Logged in 1993, the proceeds of the timber helped fund projects for other parks in Chehalis, notably Penny Playground. A local Boy Scouts troop replanted the area with hopes to use it as a learning forest but the effort did not materialize. The city attempted to consider the area surplus in 2005, following up with an attempt in 2006 to pursue the construction of a reservoir on the property; the endeavors were unsuccessful. The city continues to provide general maintenance to the park.

East Side Park

Begun in 1906 with a $500 fund, the park occupied a triangular area near the St. Helens Hotel in the downtown district. Issues with the grade and road improvements would plague the completion of the project. Never completed, the space would be overtaken in 1910 for the building of the Chehalis Carnegie library.

Other recreation

The Riverside Golf Course is nestled between the Chehalis–Centralia Airport and the Chehalis River. Spanning 110 acres (45 ha), it plays 6,155 yards for a par of 71. Originally a nine-hole course when first constructed in 1927, it expanded to 18 holes in 1971. It has hosted various charity fundraisers, competitions and playoffs for local high school golf teams, and the Lewis County Amateur Championship.

References

External links
 City of Chehalis Parks and Recreation
 Chehalis Community Renaissance Team
 Chehalis Foundation, Parks and Recreation
 Lewis County Community Trails

Chehalis, Washington
Parks in Lewis County, Washington
Hiking trails in Washington (state)